Gabrielle Zevin (born October 24, 1977) is an American author and screenwriter.

Personal life 
Zevin was born in New York City. Zevin's father, who is American-born, has Ashkenazi Jewish, Russian, Lithuanian, and Polish ancestry. Her mother was born in Korea and emigrated to the United States when she was 9 years old. The two met in high school in Connecticut and later worked for IBM.

She grew up in Boca Raton, Florida and graduated from Spanish River Community High School in 1996. She enrolled at Harvard University, where she studied English with a concentration in American Literature. While at Harvard, she met her partner, Hans Canosa and graduated in 2000.

For nearly a decade, Zevin lived in Manhattan before moving to Los Angeles in 2012, where she presently lives with Canosa.

Writing

Novels 
Zevin's debut novel, Margarettown, published in 2005, was a selection of the Barnes & Noble Discover Great New Writers Program and longlisted for the James Tiptree Jr. Award. In a starred review, Kirkus Reviews called the novel "a droll piece of romantic whimsy with an unexpected resonance."

In 2014, The Storied Life of A. J. Fikry debuted on the New York Times Best Seller List, reached #1 on the National Indie Best Seller List, and went on to become an international bestseller. It has been translated into over thirty languages. In 2021, shooting commenced on a feature film adaptation of the novel, starring Kunal Nayyar in the title role, and Lucy Hale, Christina Hendricks, David Arquette, and Scott Foley. Zevin wrote the screenplay adaptation of her novel.

Her fourth novel for adults, Young Jane Young (2017), was also met with popular and critical acclaim. Kirkus Reviews called it "the best thing to come out of the Monica Lewinsky scandal since Lewinsky's own magnificent TED talk."

Tomorrow, and Tomorrow, and Tomorrow was released in 2022 as Zevin's fifth novel for adults. It won the 2022 Goodreads Choice Award for Best Fiction.

Novels for young readers 
Zevin has also written books for young readers. Her first YA novel Elsewhere was published in 2005, three months after her adult debut, Margarettown. It was chosen as an American Library Association Notable Children's Book, nominated for a 2006 Quill award, won the Borders Original Voices Award, and was a selection of the Barnes & Noble Book Club. It also made the Carnegie long list. The book has been translated into over 25 languages.

Zevin's 2007 Young adult book Memoirs of a Teenage Amnesiac was chosen for  the ALA Best Books for Young Adults list. In 2010, she and Hans Canosa adapted it into a screenplay that became the Japanese movie Dareka ga Watashi ni Kiss wo Shita (Someone Kissed Me), starring top teen idol actress Maki Horikita.

Other writing 
In 2007, Zevin was nominated for an Independent Spirit Award for Best First Screenplay for Conversations with Other Women. The film was directed by Hans Canosa and starred Helena Bonham Carter and Aaron Eckhart.

Zevin has written book reviews for the New York Times Book Review and NPR's All Things Considered.

Awards and nominations

Bibliography

Novels
 Margarettown (2005)
 The Hole We're In (2010)
 The Storied Life of A. J. Fikry (2014)
 Young Jane Young (2017)
 Tomorrow, and Tomorrow, and Tomorrow (2022)

Novels for Young Readers
 Elsewhere (2005)
 Memoirs of a Teenage Amnesiac (2007)
 All These Things I've Done (2011)
 Because It Is My Blood (2012)
 In the Age of Love and Chocolate (2013)

Screenplays
 Alma Mater (2002)
 Conversations with Other Women (2005)
 Memoirs of a Teenage Amnesiac (2010)
 The Storied Life of A. J. Fikry (2022)

References

External links

Gabrielle Zevin's Official Website

The New York Times Book Review of Elsewhere
All Things Considered Interview: "In 'Storied Life,' Characters Come with a Reading List"
Weekend Edition Sunday Interview: "'Young Jane Young' Is A Political Sex Scandal, Told Through Women's Eyes"

1977 births
Living people
21st-century American novelists
21st-century American women writers
American people of Russian-Jewish descent
American writers of Korean descent
American women novelists
Harvard College alumni
Writers from New York City
Novelists from New York (state)